Dominik Smékal (born 22 January  1998) is a Czech footballer who currently plays as a midfielder for Hlučín.

Club career
In 2015, while in the youth academy of Italian side Inter Milan, Smékal was named by English newspaper The Guardian as one of the most promising young footballers born in 1998.

In 2022, he joined Moravian-Silesian Football League side Hlučín on a six-month loan deal, later making this deal permanent. He scored a famous hattrick for Hlučín against Viktoria Plzeň in the 2022–23 Czech Cup, as his side went on to win 3–2.

Career statistics

Club

Notes

References

1998 births
Living people
People from Boskovice
Sportspeople from the South Moravian Region
Czech footballers
Czech Republic youth international footballers
Association football midfielders
Slovak Super Liga players
Moravian-Silesian Football League players
Czech National Football League players
FC Baník Ostrava players
SK Sigma Olomouc players
Inter Milan players
FK Senica players
FC Odra Petřkovice players
SFC Opava players
MFK Karviná players
FC Hlučín players
Czech expatriate footballers
Czech expatriate sportspeople in Italy
Czech expatriate sportspeople in Slovakia
Expatriate footballers in Italy
Expatriate footballers in Slovakia